The 1985 Cornwall County Council election for the Cornwall County Council were held on 2 May 1985, as part of the wider 1985 local elections.

Results

|}

References

Cornwall
1985
1980s in Cornwall